Clarence Valentine McGeary Jr. (August 8, 1926 – April 6, 1993) was a defensive tackle in the National Football League.

McGeary was born on August 8, 1926 in Saint Paul, Minnesota. McGeary was drafted by the Green Bay Packers in the thirtieth round of the 1948 NFL Draft and later played with the team during the 1950 NFL season. He played at the collegiate level at North Dakota State University and the University of Minnesota.

See also
List of Green Bay Packers players

References

1926 births
1993 deaths
Players of American football from Saint Paul, Minnesota
American football defensive tackles
North Dakota State Bison football players
Minnesota Golden Gophers football players
Green Bay Packers players